This is a list of members of the 54th Legislative Assembly of Queensland from 2012 to 2015, as elected at the 2012 election held on 24 March 2012.

See also
Speaker of the Legislative Assembly of Queensland

Notes 

 South Brisbane Labor MP and former Premier Anna Bligh resigned on 30 March 2012. Labor candidate Jackie Trad won the resulting by-election on 28 April 2012.
 Condamine MP Ray Hopper resigned from the Liberal National Party and joined Katter's Australian Party on 24 November 2012.
 Gaven MP Alex Douglas and Yeerongpilly MP Carl Judge resigned from the Liberal National Party on 29 November 2012 and subsequently sat as independents until they joined the Palmer United Party on 30 April 2013. Douglas subsequently resigned from the Palmer United Party in August 2014 and sat again as an independent. Judge resigned from the Palmer United Party in October 2014 and sat again as an independent.
 Redcliffe MP Scott Driscoll was suspended from the Liberal National Party on 25 March 2013, and resigned from the party the following month. He subsequently sat as an independent until he resigned from Parliament on 19 November 2013. Labor candidate Yvette D'Ath won the resulting by-election on 22 February 2014.
 Stafford Liberal National MP Chris Davis resigned on 23 May 2014. Labor candidate Anthony Lynham won the resulting by-election on 19 July 2014.

References

Members of Queensland parliaments by term
21st-century Australian politicians